A folk costume (also regional costume, national costume, traditional garment, or traditional regalia) expresses an identity through costume, which is usually associated with a geographic area or a period of time in history. It can also indicate social, marital or religious status. If the costume is used to represent the culture or identity of a specific ethnic group, it is usually known as ethnic costume (also ethnic dress, ethnic wear, ethnic clothing, traditional ethnic wear or traditional ethnic garment). Such costumes often come in two forms: one for everyday occasions, the other for traditional festivals and formal wear. The word "costume" in this context is sometimes considered pejorative due to the multiple senses of the word, and in such cases "regalia" can be substituted without offense.

Following the rise of romantic nationalism, the pre-industrial peasantry of Europe came to serve as models for all that appeared genuine and desirable. Their garments are crystallized into so-called "typical" forms, and enthusiasts adopted that attire as part of their symbolism. These garments may be made from traditional pre-industrial textiles, in regional styles.

In areas where Western dress codes have become usual, traditional garments are often worn at special events or celebrations; particularly those connected with cultural traditions, heritage or pride. International events may cater for non-Western attendees with a compound dress code such as "business suit or national dress".

In modern times, there are instances where traditional garments are required by sumptuary laws. In Bhutan, the traditional Tibetan-style clothing of gho and kera for men, and kira and toego for women, must be worn by all citizens, including those not of Tibetan heritage. In Saudi Arabia, women are also required to wear the abaya in public.

Africa

Central Africa

 Cameroon – Pagne (female), Toghu (male)
 Central African Republic – Pagne
 Democratic Republic of the Congo – Pagne
 Equatorial Guinea – Pano
 Gabon – Pagne
 Republic of the Congo – Pagne
 São Tomé and Príncipe – Pano

Eastern Africa

 Burundi – Imvutano
 Comoros – Lesso (female), Kanzu (male)
 Djibouti – Macawiis (male), Koofiyad (male), Dirac (female), Garbasaar (female); the Afar people have their style of traditional clothing.
 Eritrea – Kidan Habesha (male), Zuria or Habesha kemis (female)
 Ethiopia – Ethiopian suit or Kidan Habesha (male), Habesha kemis (female); each ethnic group has a traditional style of dress.
 Kenya – Does not have a national costume. All tribes have their respective traditional garments, for example: Maasai traditional costume: Kitenge, Kikoi, Maasai beadwork
 Madagascar – Lamba
 Mauritius and Réunion  – Sega dress
 Rwanda  – Mushanana
 Seychelles  – Kanmtole dress
 Somalia – Kanzu or Khamiis, Macawiis (male), Kitenge Koofiyad (male), Dirac (female), Guntiino (female), Garbasaar (female)
 Sudan – Jalabiyyah, Taqiyyah, and Turban (male), Toob, a cotton women's dress (female)
 Tanzania – Kanzu and Kofia (male), Kanga (female)
 Uganda – Kanzu and Kofia (male), Gomesi (female), Mushanana (Female - South Western Uganda)

Northern Africa

 Algeria - Burnous, Caftan, Caftan El-Bey, Gandoura, Haïek, Jellaba, Mlaya, Sarouel
 Bikhmar (Ouargla)
 Blouza (Oran)
 Chedda (Tlemcen)
 Chemsa (Jijel)
 Fergani (Constantine)
 Gandoura Annabiya (Annaba)
 Ghlila, Karakou, Sarouel Mdawer (Algiers)
 Labsa M'zabia (M'zab)
 Labsa Naïlia (Ouled Naïl)
 Lefa we dlala (Annaba)
 Melhfa Chaouïa (Aures)
 Melhfa Sahraouia (Tindouf)
 Qashabiya (Djelfa et Laghouat), Labsa Kbaylia (Kabylie)
 Binouar - Sétif 
 Labsa Touratia (Hoggar)
 Egypt – Galabeya
 Libya – Jellabiya, Farmla (an embroidered vest), Fouta
 Morocco – Djellaba, Fez hat and Balgha (male), Takchita (female)
 Sahrawi Arab Democratic Republic – Darra'a (male), Melhfa Sahraouia (female)
 Tunisia – Jebba, Chechia, Fouta

Southern Africa

 Angola – Pano
Botswana - leteisi and Tshega
 Lesotho – Shweshwe clothing and blankets, Mokorotlo
 Malawi – Chitenje
 Mozambique – Capulana
 Namibia – Herero traditional clothing
 South Africa –
 Sotho: Shweshwe clothing and blankets, Mokorotlo
 Xhosa: Umbhaco
 Zulu: Isicholo
 Afrikaners and Rooineks: slouch hat, safari shirt, veldskoen, knee-high socks, khaki Bermuda shorts or trousers.
 Zambia – Chitenje
 Zimbabwe – Chitenje

Western Africa

 Benin – Dashiki suit and Aso Oke Hat (male), Buba and wrapper set (female)
 Burkina Faso – Batakari (male), Kaftan (female)
 Cape Verde – Pano de terra
 Côte d'Ivoire – Kente cloth (male), Kente kaba and slit set (female)
 Gambia – Boubou (male), Kaftan (female)
 Ghana – Kente cloth or Ghanaian smock and Kufi (male), Kente kaba and slit set (female), Agbada (male)
 Guinea – Boubou (male), Kaftan (female)
 Guinea-Bissau – Ethnic clothes of Guinea-Bissau; for example: Fula: Boubou (male), Kaftan (female)
 Liberia – Dashiki suit and Kufi (male), Buba and skirt set (female)
 Mali – Grand boubou and Kufi (male), Kaftan (female)
 Mauritania – Darra'a (male), Melhfa Sahraouia (female)
 Niger – Babban riga, Tagelmust, Alasho (male), Kaftan (female)
 Nigeria – Agbada, Dashiki or Isiagu and Aso Oke Hat (male), Buba and wrapper set (female)
 Senegal – Senegalese kaftan and Kufi (male), Kaftan (female)
 Togo - Batakari, Agbada or Ewe kente cloth (male), Pagne or kente kaba (female)

Asia

Central Asia
 Tajikistan - Chapan, Tubeteika, Turban, Paranja

Turkic Countries:
 Kazakhstan – Chapan, Kalpak (male), Saukele, Koylek (female)
 Kyrgyzstan – Chapan, Kalpak (male), Saukele, Koylek (female)
 Turkmenistan – Chapan
 Uzbekistan – Khalat, Tubeteika, Chapan, Turban, Paranja

East Asia

 China – Cheongsam and Changshan (de facto; each ethnic groups of China have their own traditional costume)
Han Chinese – Hanfu: Shenyi, ruqun, shanku
 Manchus – Magua, Tangzhuang, Cheongsam and Changshan
 Mongols – Deel
 Uyghurs, Hui and other Chinese Muslims – Tubeteika, Khalat, Chapan
 Tibetan – Chuba
 Japan – Wafuku: Kimono, Junihitoe, Sokutai
 Fukuoka Prefecture – Mizu happi 
 Hokkaido – Ainu clothing
 Ryukyu – /Ryusou
 Okinawa – Kariyushi shirt
 Korea – Hanbok (South Korea)/Chosŏn-ot (North Korea)
 Mongolia – Deel
 Taiwan - Aboriginal groups in Taiwan conserve traditional indigenous styles; popular styles include Amis, Atayal, Bunun and Paiwan styles

North Asia
 Russia (Urals, Siberian Federal District and Far Eastern Siberia) – Clothing of Siberian nationalities (Buryat, Yakut, Altai, etc.)
 Buryatia - Deel
 Tuva – Deel

South Asia

 Afghanistan – Pashtun dress: Afghan cap, turban, Shalwar Kameez (male), Firaq partug, Burqa, Chador (veil) (female)
 Bangladesh – Sherwani and Kurta (male), Sari and Shalwar Kameez (female)
 Bhutan – Gho (male) and Kira (female)
 India – Achkan, Shalwar Kameez, Sherwani, Dhoti, Phiran, Churidar, Kurta, Turban (male) and Sari, Patiala salwar, Lehenga, Choli, Pathin (female)
 Maldives – Dhivehi libaas (women) and Dhivehi mundu (men)
 Nepal – Daura-Suruwal and Dhaka topi, (male) and Gunyou Cholo (female); Traditional Newar, Sunuwar, Rai, Limbu ([bakku, chuwa])clothing
 Pakistan – Peshawari turban, Shalwar Kameez, Churidar (male), Shalwar Kameez and Dupatta (female), Punjabi turban
 Sri Lanka – Kandyan sari (female)

Southeast Asia

 Brunei – Baju Melayu, Songkok (male), Baju Kurung, Tudung (female)
 Cambodia – Sampot, Apsara, Sabai, Krama, Chang kben
 East Timor – Tais cloth clothing
 Indonesia – (See: National costume of Indonesia). There are hundreds of types of folk costumes in Indonesia because of the diversity in the island nation. Each ethnic group of Indonesia have their own traditional costume;
 Batak tribe: Ulos
 Javanese people: Beskap, Batik shirt, Blangkon, Songkok, Sarong (male), Kebaya, Tudung, Sarong (female).
 Malay people: Baju Melayu, Baju Kurung, Songket
 Papua: Koteka 
 etc.

 Laos – xout lao, suea pat, pha hang, pha biang, sinh
 Malaysia – Baju Melayu and Songkok (male), Baju Kurung, Baju Kebarung (Kebaya/Kurung hybrid), Tudung (female); every state has its style of baju including a special baju for the Federal Territories.
 Myanmar – Longyi, Gaung baung
 Philippines – Barong (male) and Baro't saya; Maria Clara gown, Terno (female), Malong, Patadyong, Tapis, Salakot
 Singapore:
 Chinese Singaporeans - Hanfu, Cheongsam (female), Tangzhuang (male)，Changpao (male)
 Indian Singaporeans - Sari (Female), Dhoti (Male), Kurta
 Malay Singaporeans - Baju Melayu (Male), Baju Kurung (female), Sarong
 Peranakans - Kebaya (female), Baju Lokchuan (male)
 Thailand – Chut thai: Thai female: Thai Chakkri, Thai male: Suea Phraratchathan, Both genders: Chong kraben and Sabai
 Vietnam – Việt phục: Áo giao lĩnh, Áo dài, Áo tứ thân, Áo bà ba

West Asia

 Armenia - Armenian dress, Arkhalig, Arakhchin, Burka, Chokha, Kalpak, Papakha, Shalvar
 Azerbaijan – Azerbaijani traditional clothing: Arkhalig, Chokha, Kelaghayi, Kalpak
 Cyprus - Zimbouni (waistcoat) and Vraka (breeches) (men) and Saiya (formal festival dress) (women)
 Turkish Republic of Northern Cyprus - Cepken(Yelek)-Vest, Salta, Yazma, Potur, Boynuz Kemer
 Israel – Sudra, Tanakhi sandals, Tembel hat, Yemenite Jewish clothes; Jewish religious clothing: Rekel, Bekishe, Tzitzit, Kippah, Tichel.
 Iran – Chador, Turban, Thawb (Dishdasha/Kameez), Kurdish clothing, Zardozi, Battoulah
 Iraq – Assyrian clothing, Keffiyeh, Hashimi Dress, Bisht, Dishdasha, Kurdish clothing, Agal, Bisht
 Jordan – Keffiyeh, Bisht, Bedouin clothing
 Lebanon – Tantour, Labbade, Sherwal, Keffiyeh, Taqiyah
 Kuwait – Dishdasha, Keffiyeh
 Oman – Dishdasha, Khanjar, Keffiyeh
 Palestine – Keffiyeh, Palestinian costumes.
 Qatar – Thawb, Keffiyeh
 Saudi Arabia – Thawb, Ghutrah, Agal, Bisht, Abaya, Jilbab, Niqab
 Syria – Dishdasha, Sirwal, Taqiyah, Keffiyeh
 Turkey - Kalpak, Yazma, Kaftan, Turban, Salvar, Çarık,Cepken-Yelek, Boynuz Kemer -Horn belt
 United Arab Emirates – Kandura, Abaya; older women would still wear the battoulah visor
 Yemen – Thawb, Izaar, Turban, Jambiya, Niqab

Europe

Eastern Europe
 Belarus – Slutsk stash, the national type of wimple (namitka)
 Georgia – Chokha (Every region has its own specific design of Chokha), Papakha
 Ossetia – Chokha
 Russia – Bast shoes, Boyar hat, Ryasna, Sarafan, Kaftan, Kokoshnik, Kosovorotka, Ushanka, Valenki; (Sami) Gákti, Luhkka for colder weather
 Caucasus republics (for example, Chechnya, North Ossetia-Alania and Adygea) – Chokha, Papakha, Ushanka in cold weather
 Mordovia - Mordovian national costumes
 Ukraine – National costumes of Ukraine: Vyshyvanka, Sharovary, Żupan, Ukrainian wreath

Central Europe
 Austria - Each state has a specific design on national costume; the most famous is that of Tyrol, consisting of the characteristic Tyrolean tracht and dirndls.
 Czech Republic – Kroje
 Hungary – National costumes of Hungary
 Poland – Czamara, Żupan, Kontusz, Rogatywka (National costumes of Poland)
 Slovakia – Kroj (embroidered traditional dress)

Northern Europe
 Denmark – Folkedragt
 Faroe Islands – Føroysk klæði
 Greenland – Anorak
 Estonia – 
 Finland – Every region has its own specific design of national costume (kansallispuku, nationaldräkt). These vary widely. Many of them resemble Swedish costumes, but some take influences from Russian costumes as well. For the Sami in Finland, each place has its own Gákti or Luhkka for colder weather.
 Iceland  – Þjóðbúningurinn
 Ireland – Aran sweater, Irish walking hat, flat cap, Grandfather shirt, Galway shawl, brogue, Irish stepdance costume
 Latvia - Tautastērps
 Lithuania - Tautinis kostiumas
 Norway – Every county (including Svalbard, which isn't a county) has a designated style of folk costume, or Bunad; the most famous bunader come from Hardanger and Setesdal; Sami: Gákti, and for colder weather, Luhkka
 Sweden – the traditional folkdräkt has been specific to the local region and varied from province to province but has since 1983 been supplemented by an official National Costume, Sverigedräkten, common for all; 18th century: Nationella dräkten; Sami: Gákti, Luhkka for colder weather
 United Kingdom: Every constituent country has its own national costume.
 England – English country clothing, Morris dance costumes, Flat cap, English clogs
 Cornwall – Sou'wester hat, fisherman's smock, gansey, bal-maiden clothing, Cornish kilts and tartans
 Lancashire – Lancashire shawl, English clogs
 London – Pearly kings and queens
 Northumbria - Maud, blue bonnet, Rapper dance costumes, Northumberland kilts and tartan
 Southern England – smock
 Northern Ireland: Similar to the rest of Ireland.
 Scotland – Highland dress: Kilt or trews, tam o'shanter or Balmoral bonnet, doublet, Aboyne dress, and brogues or ghillies.
 Scottish Lowlands: Similar to Northumbria – Maud, blue bonnet
 Wales – Traditional Welsh costume

Southern Europe
 Albania – Albanian Traditional Clothing, Fustanella, Tirq, Xhamadan, Opinga 
 Andorra – Barretina, espadrilles
 Bulgaria – Every town has its own design of a national costume (nosia), with different types of clothing items traditional for each of the ethnographic regions of the country.
 Croatia – Croatian national costume, Lika cap, Šibenik cap
 Greece – Fustanella, Breeches(Vraka), Amalia costume.
 Greek fisherman's caps in many coastal villages by the Aegean sea.
 Italy – Italian folk dance costumes; Roman clothing: Toga, Stola
 South Tyrol – Tracht and Dirndl
 Sardinia – Every town has its design of the traditional folk costume (see also Sardinian people for more information).
 Sicily – Coppola, Arbereshe costumes
 Kosovo – Traditional clothing of Kosovo, Qeleshe, Tirq, Xhubleta, Xhamadan, Opinga 
 Malta – Għonnella
 Montenegro – Montenegrin cap
 North Macedonia – Macedonian national costume
 Portugal – Every region has its own specific design of a national costume. The most famous costumes come from Viana do Castelo and Nazaré.
 Romania – Romanian dress
 Serbia – Every region has different design of a national costume. Serbian traditional clothing, Lika cap, Montenegrin cap, Opanci, Šajkača, Šubara
 Slovenia – Gorenjska narodna noša
 Spain – Every autonomous region has its own national costume. 
 Andalusia - Sombrero cordobes, traje de flamenca, traje de luces, montera
 Basque Country – Beret, espadrilles
 Catalonia - Barretina, Faixa
 Galicia - Each province has its regional costume.

Western Europe
 Belgium – Bleu sårot (Wallonia)
 France – Every administrative region has a style of folk costume, varying by department. For example, Brittany, with Breton costume varying by department and predominantly used in Cercles celtiques, pardons and festivals.
 Basque Country – Beret, espadrille
 Germany – Every state has its own specific design of a national costume (Tracht). For example, Bavaria's well-known tracht: Lederhosen and Dirndl.

 Liechtenstein – Tracht, Dirndl
 Netherlands – Many areas, villages and towns used to have their own traditional style of clothing. In the 21st century, only a few hundred people still wear the traditional dresses and suits on a daily basis. They can be found mainly in Staphorst (about 700 women), Volendam (about 50 men) and Marken (about 40 women). Most well-known parts of Dutch folk costumes outside the Netherlands are probably the Dutch woman's bonnet and klompen.
 North Brabant – poffer
 Switzerland - Every canton has a specific design of national dress. The most famous Swiss costumes come mainly from the German-speaking cantons of Appenzell, Bern and Zug.

North America

Caribbean
 Antigua and Barbuda – plaid dress, with white pinafore for women, designed by Heather Doram
 Bahamas - None, unofficially Androsia-cloth clothing. Junkanoo costumes can be considered folk costume but fall more into the sector of carnival dress than traditional garment.
 Cuba – Guayabera, panama hat (male), guarachera (female)
 Dominican Republic – Chacabana, panama hat
 Dominica – Madras
 Haiti – Karabela dress (female), Shirt jacket (male)
 Jamaica – Bandanna cloth Quadrille dress (female), Bandanna cloth shirt and white trousers (male), Jamaican Tam
 Puerto Rico – Guayabera, panama hat (male), enaguas (female)
 St. Lucia – Madras
 Trinidad and Tobago – Tobago has an Afro-Tobagonian Creole culture with the Bélé costumes as their typical garment, commonly made of madras. Trinidad, however, has no defined national garment; the two major ethnic groups in the island wear the following during cultural occasions:
Afro-Trinidadians - Shirt jacket or Dashiki (male), Booboo (female)
Indo-Trinidadian - Kurta, Dhoti, Sherwani (male), Sari, Choli, Lehenga (female)

Central America
 Belize – Mestizos - Huipil (female), Guayabera (male); Mayas - All tribes wear distinct kinds of Mayan dress.
 Guatemala – Huipil, Corte skirt, Tocado (female), Todosantero suit (male)
 Nicaragua – Huipil, Rebozo (female), Cotona (male)
 Panama – Pollera (female), Montuno (male)

Northern America
 Bermuda – Bermuda shorts
 Canada:
First Nations – button blanket, buckskins, moccasins, Chilkat blanket, Cowichan sweater, war bonnet. The use of the term costume to denote traditional dress may be considered derogatory in First Nations communities. Regalia is the preferred term.
Lumberjacks of Quebec and Ontario – Traditional logging wear includes mackinaw jackets or flannel shirts, with headgear being a tuque or trapper hat; a good example is seen with folk characters like Big Joe Mufferaw.
Maritimes – Acadians wear their traditional heritage clothing on special occasions like the Tintamarre. The Scottish background in Nova Scotia has brought the Nova Scotia tartan as folk wear in the form of kilts, aboyne dresses and trews for Scottish highland dance competitions.
Métis – Ceinture fléchée, Capote, Moccasins
Newfoundland - Traditional mummers dress in masks and baggy clothes in Christmas season celebrations; the Cornish influence has also brought yellow oilskins and sou'westers as typical wear in coastal areas.
Nunavut and other Inuit communities – Parka, mukluks, amauti
 Prairies – Western wear is common on events such as the Calgary Stampede; often worn with Calgary White Hats.
Quebec and French Canadians – Ceinture fléchée, Capote, tuque
 Mexico – Charro outfit, Guayabera, Sarape, Sombrero (male), Rebozo, China Poblana dress (female); every state has a typical folk dress, for example:
 Chiapas – Chiapaneca
 Chihuahua and Coahuila – cowboy hats, cowboy boots, bandanna
 Oaxaca: Tehuana
 Querétaro, Hidalgo and San Luis Potosí - Quechquemitl
 Sonora - Sonora is unique among Mexican states to not have a defined representative costume, yet the indigenous clothing, especially the Deer dance costume of the Yaqui and the women's clothing of the Seri, is very popular. However, the Sonora Bronco styles of Norteño folk dance have a costume akin to that of neighboring Chihuahua, but is not mostly regarded as a definite costume for Sonora.
 Tamaulipas Cuera tamaulipeca
 Veracruz - Guayabera
 Yucatán – Guayabera (male), Huipil (female)
 United States:
 Alaska – Kuspuks, worn with dark pants and mukluks, as well as parkas are traditional native wear.
 Hawaii – Aloha shirt, Muumuu, Holokū, Pāʻū (skirt; can be made of kapa cloth or grass; modern variations are textile cloth-based with Hawaiian leaf and flower motifs), Malo (loincloth)
 American Southwest, Texas and rural areas in the Midwestern and Western US – Western wear, derived from original Mexican vaquero and American pioneer garb is traditional dress in Texas, the Southwestern US, and many rural communities, including cowboy hats, Western shirts, cowboy boots, jeans, chaps, prairie skirts, and bolo ties.
 Utah – Mormons may dress in 19th-century pioneer clothing for Mormon trek-related activities and events.
 American Upper Midwest, Pacific Northwest, the northern portions of the Great Lakes Basin and northern New England (especially Maine) – Due to the cold weather, the garb in rural areas tends to more closely adhere to heavier materials, such as flannel shirts or Buffalo plaid mackinaw jackets, and a knit cap or, in the case of the Upper Peninsula, a Stormy Kromer cap. A good example is seen in the typical attire of Paul Bunyan, a folk hero popular in areas where logging was a common occupation, as well as lumberjacks working in the area.
 The Amish (mostly found in Pennsylvania, Ohio and Indiana) follow a style of plain dress.
 Deep South –
 Louisiana – The Cajun people of Louisiana traditionally wear the colorful capuchon for Mardi Gras celebrations. Creole women used to historically wear the tignon, mostly in plain or madras fabrics, but it is now sometimes worn for heritage events or cultural reasons.
 South Carolina and Georgia – Gullah communities in the South Carolina Lowcountry and Sea Islands preserve the traditional African-style clothing and culture.
 Nantucket – Summer residents of Nantucket will often wear Nantucket Reds.
 Various styles of Native American clothing; for example, traditional pow-wow regalia for Plains Indians: Moccasins, buckskins, glass beads, breech clouts, and war bonnets or roaches. The use of the term costume to denote traditional dress may be considered derogatory in Native American communities. Regalia is the preferred term.
 New York – According to folklorist Washington Irving, knickerbockers similar to the breeches of the Pilgrims and Founding Fathers were traditionally worn by many wealthy Dutch families in 19th century New York. Historically, these short pants remained commonplace among young urban American boys until the mid 20th century.
 Patriotic historic European-American costume, especially in the Northeastern United States, includes clothing styles of the Plymouth Pilgrims, Founding Fathers of the United States, William Penn, or Minutemen. (See .)

Oceania

Australia and New Zealand
 Australia
 Aboriginal Australians: fibercraft-made clothing, possum cloak
 European Australians: cork hat, bushwear: Moleskin trousers, bush shirt, Akubra slouch hat, Driza-Bone coat, Australian work boots
 Torres Strait Islands – Augemwalli
 New Zealand
 Māori – Piupiu, korowai or kakahu huruhuru.
 New Zealand Europeans - Swanndri bush jacket, slouch hat, walk shorts, and knee-high socks; or a black singlet and rugby shorts.

Melanesia
 Fiji – Sulu, Tapa cloth (called masi), I-sala
 New Caledonia – Manou, Robes mission
 Papua New Guinea – Meri blaus, lap-lap, Koteka
 Vanuatu – Aelan dress, Lap-lap

Micronesia
 Federated States of Micronesia - Lap-lap (male), Grass skirt (female)
 Palau - Lap-lap (male), Grass skirt (female)

Polynesia
 Cook Islands – Pareo
 French Polynesia – Pareo
 Samoa – Lavalava, Puletasi, 'ie toga clothing
 Tonga – Tupenu, Ta'ovala, Tapa cloth

South America

 Argentina – Gaucho costume; every province has a specific design of poncho, with the poncho salteño being the most recognized. 
 Bolivia – Poncho, Chullo, Andean pollera
 Brazil – Each region has its own traditional costume. 
 Bahia – Baiana and Abadá
 Brazilian carnival or Samba costumes for Rio de Janeiro.
 Caipiras (Brazilian country folk) in Sao Paulo, Goiás and other nearby states conserve traditional folk styles of clothing, imitated by participants of festa juninas.
 Gaúcho costumes for Rio Grande Do Sul. 
 Indigenous clothes for many states within the Amazônia Legal area
 Northeastern sertão (desert) – Vaqueiro or Cangaceiro clothing
 Chile – Huaso costume: Chamanto, Chupalla
 Colombia – Sombrero Vueltiao, ruana, white shirt, trousers and alpargatas (male), blouse, Cumbia pollera, Sombrero vueltiao and alpargatas (female); every region has a distinct costume.
 Ecuador – Poncho, Panama hat
 Guyana - Guyana is unique among South American nations to not have a designated style of national dress. Every ethnic group wears their cultural clothing during important events or occasions:
 Afro-Guyanese - Dashiki or Shirt jacket (male), Booboo (female)
 Indo-Guyanese - Kurta, Sherwani, Churidar (male), Sari, Lehenga (female)
 Every indigenous tribe wears their tribal clothes during culture events or important occasions.
 Paraguay – Ao po'i
 Peru – Chullo, Poncho, Andean pollera
 Suriname – Kotomisse, Pangi cloth
 Uruguay – Gaucho costume
 Venezuela – Llanero costume (Liqui liqui and pelo e' guama hat; men), Joropo dress and pelo e' guama hat (women)

Notes